NGC 531 is a barred spiral galaxy in the constellation Andromeda with a visual magnitude of 10.51. It is a distance of 65.7 Mpc from the Sun. It is a member of the Hickson Compact Group HCG 10, and is interacting with the other members of the group.

References

External links
 

NGC 531 on SIMBAD

Barred spiral galaxies
Andromeda (constellation)
0536
01012
005340
+06-04-020
J01261884